Graham Peter Jones (born 3 March 1966) is a British Labour Party politician, and former Member of Parliament (MP) for Hyndburn.

Early life and education
Jones was brought up in Baxenden, attending St John's CofE Primary School, Baxenden, and St Christopher's Church of England High School, Accrington. He attended Accrington and Rossendale College, studying A levels. After three years at college, Jones was employed for Blackburn with Darwen Council on refuse collection, and by Lancashire County Council as a carer home assistant.

Jones attended the University of Central Lancashire, to study an BA (Hons) in Applied Social Studies. In 1989, he studied Graphic Design, and completed the City and Guilds qualification in Desktop Publishing, followed by employment at Holland's Pies. He then took employment for two years with Blackburn Council working on the parks department in summer and the refuse collection in winter. 

Jones had periods of temporary and part time work for Lancashire County Council in various roles; as a community transport driver, meals on wheels driver and care assistant at Whinberry View, Rawtenstall. He attended night school passing City & Guilds qualifications in digital press-press. He was offered employment by the leading recruitment firm, The Orchard Agency in Manchester undertaking prepress work, followed by employment at the Manchester Evening News. Jones also taught prepress at evening classes at Preston College, later at Accrington and Rossendale College. 

From 2001 until 7 May 2010, the day after the 2010 general election, Jones worked at Daltons Printers.

According to his relative Kathleen Thom, Jones' family were "senior members in the Accrington Labour Party between and after the second world war holding regular meetings in the Woodnook area where they lived". 

Jones's father's family originate from the Mill Hill area of Blackburn, and his mother's family from Accrington. His grandfather worked at Howard and Bulloughs Cotton Mil.

Local government career
In November 2001, he was one of two candidates, selected from four, to contest the safe Labour seat of Peel Ward on Hyndburn Council. He was re-elected in 2004, and again in 2008.

In May 2005, he was elected as the Opposition Leader on Hyndburn Borough Council, and remained as such until his resignation as an councillor from Hyndburn Council in May 2010, the seat being retained by Labour Councillor Wendy Dwyer, who had been Jones' predecessor in the Accrington South division on Lancashire County Council elections.

In June 2009, he contested the Accrington South Division (Peel, Baxenden and Barnfield wards) for the County Council amidst the MP's expenses scandal. His majority was reduced from 17.6% to 17.1%, a majority of 469 votes turning it into one of Labour's safer seats. Across Lancashire County, Labour were reduced from 44 seats to 16.

In February 2010 The Blackburn Citizen reported that Jones had acted in "technical breach" of council rules, in discussing unadopted roads Annie Street, Hodder Street and Manor Street at meetings, whilst on one occasion failing to mention that he lived on Hodder Street. The Hyndburn Standards Committee concluded that Jones had not attempted to conceal his address from the council having declared it on other occasions.

In July 2010, he was also involved in a dispute with rival councillor Peter Britcliffe, who implied that Jones had other undeclared property interests. This was by repeatedly shouting "two houses" at Jones during a council meeting. Britcliffe subsequently apologised after legal threats, acknowledging the second home referred did belong to a late relative of Jones, and was not his property.

Parliamentary career
Hyndburn's Labour MP Greg Pope suddenly announced his intention to step down on 11 June 2009. In November 2009, Jones was chosen as the candidate to succeed him by Labour; he held the seat by a majority of 3,090 at the 2010 general election.

In October 2010, Jones was appointed to the Labour Whips office, following Ed Miliband becoming Labour leader. He was an assistant whip throughout the 2010–15 Parliament.  In August 2013, he was reselected as the Labour candidate for the 2015 general election.

On 14 September 2015, Jones resigned from the front benches of Labour, following the election of Jeremy Corbyn in the leadership contest. He said he could not serve under Mr Corbyn as he was from the "extreme left", and did not hold Labour's "true values". Jones was critical of Corbyn's policies on welfare, the economy and immigration, and believed Labour in opposition must be "more fiscally responsible". He supported Owen Smith in the failed attempt to replace Jeremy Corbyn in the 2016 leadership election.

Jones was a leading member of the successful campaign to reduce maximum stake on fixed-odds betting terminals (FOBTs) from £100 to £2. In agreeing to the change, the government has taken up a Labour manifesto pledge. Described by Labour List as "a stunning victory for those who have led a five-year long campaign to reduce the impact that FOBTs, the “crack cocaine of gambling”, can have on communities, families and individual gamblers."

Jones was also established and was Chair of the All Party Parliamentary Group on Metal, Stone and Heritage Crime to raise awareness of the social and economic impact of metal, stone and heritage crime.Jones was at the forefront of the campaign to amend the Scrap Metal Dealers Act 1964 and stamp out illegal scrap metal dealers plaguing estates. In November 2011, he introduced a private member's bill under the Ten Minute Rule, proposing licensing for scrap metal dealers in an attempt to cut down on metal theft which led to the Scrap Metals Dealers Act 2013. He called for travelling scrap metal dealers to be legally required to carry clearly visible identification signs on their vehicles including a contact number.   

By November 2017, Jones was Chair of the All Party Parliamentary Group on Venezuela, and argued in favour of support for the opposition in Venezuela.  

Jones also established the influential All Party Parliamentary Group, Transport Across the North. A dedicated cross-party forum to promote discussion and investment in all modes of transport across the North of England and to provide better opportunities for MPs representing Northern constituencies to meet with senior officials and receive briefings from Transport for the North. Jones was elected as Chair to campaign to fight for fair resources across the North. 

He was chair of the Committees on Arms Export Controls in the 57th parliament defeating the Conservative MP for North East Hampshire, Ranil Jayawardena MP. As Chair, Jones raised the 'forgotten war' in Yemen as well as raising serious concerns about China. Jones also set up the Labour Friends of Yemen at their request of the Yemeni diaspora in the UK and became its first Chair.

In 2017, Jones was also elected to the Defence Select Committee. Jones was a strong advocate for increased defence spending and defending Eastern Europe and The Caucasus's against threats from Russia. 

Jones was also one of 6 Labour MPs elected by the Parliamentary Labour Party to the Parliamentary Committee which meets weekly in private with the Leader and Deputy Leader of the Labour Party. He was also elected as Chair of the Labour Parliamentary Committee on Culture Media and Sport. 

In 2019, Jones was elected as a Parliamentary representative to the OSCE (Organization for Security and Co-operation in Europe).  

He lost his seat at the general election of 2019. His successor, Sara Britcliffe is the daughter of Peter Britcliffe, with whom as councillors he'd had taken legal action over false allegations regarding Jones' property interests. After the result had been declared, Jones said, "Obviously, I am disappointed but... I'm pleased that I went straight from a factory to a frontbencher."

Jones posted a video about his last day in Parliament.

Life after Parliament
After the election, Britcliffe was photographed in a nightclub wearing a t-shirt with Jones' picture printed on mocking him. Jones described it as "childish behaviour”.

Jones' stated he wanted to help local charities and stay involved with the local Labour Party. He stated that he is "100 per cent" committed to standing to become Hyndburn's next MP, insisting he has "unfinished business".

Personal life
Jones' partner is Kimberley Whitehead. He was previously married and has one son. He also has a daughter with Whitehead.

He is a lifelong supporter of Blackburn Rovers, and attends games at Accrington Stanley. The chairman of Accrington Stanley, Ilyas Khan, played an active role in supporting Jones' 2010 election campaign.

References

External links
Graham Jones blogspot 

1966 births
Living people
Alumni of the University of Central Lancashire
Labour Party (UK) MPs for English constituencies
Politics of Hyndburn
UK MPs 2010–2015
UK MPs 2015–2017
UK MPs 2017–2019